Carl-Dieter Spranger (born 28 March 1939 in Leipzig) is a German politician of the CSU.

He was Minister 1991–1993 (Bundesminister für wirtschaftliche Zusammenarbeit) and then 1993–1998 (Bundesminister für wirtschaftliche Zusammenarbeit und Entwicklung). He is married and has three children.

References

External links

 
 

1939 births
Politicians from Leipzig
University of Erlangen-Nuremberg alumni
Jurists from Saxony
Economic Cooperation ministers of Germany
Members of the Bundestag for Bavaria
Grand Crosses with Star and Sash of the Order of Merit of the Federal Republic of Germany
Living people
Members of the Bundestag for the Christian Social Union in Bavaria
Members of the Bundestag 1998–2002
Members of the Bundestag 1994–1998
Members of the Bundestag 1990–1994
Members of the Bundestag 1987–1990
Members of the Bundestag 1983–1987
Members of the Bundestag 1980–1983
Members of the Bundestag 1976–1980
Members of the Bundestag 1972–1976